The 2015 Gold Coast Titans season was the 9th in the club's history. Coached by Neil Henry and captained by Nate Myles, they competed in the NRL's 2015 Telstra Premiership. Gold Coast finished the regular season in 14th (out of 16) and failed to qualify for the finals for the fifth consecutive year.

Season summary
On 12 December 2014, Greg Bird was axed as co-captain and fined $15,000 by the club after he was issued with a criminal infringement notice for urinating in public. Paul Carter had his contract terminated by the club after his second drink-driving offence in a year.

In late February 2015, five players were stood down by the Titans after being charged and issued with notices to appear in court in relation to drug offences by Queensland's Crime and Corruption Commission. The players were Greg Bird (two counts of supplying a dangerous drug), Jamie Dowling (seven counts of possession and two counts of supplying a dangerous drug), Kalifa Faifai Loa (one count of supplying a dangerous drug), Beau Falloon (four counts of supplying a dangerous drug) and Dave Taylor (One count of possession and one count of supplying a dangerous drug). Ex-Titans Ashley Harrison (two counts of supplying a dangerous drug), Steve Michaels (10 counts of supplying a dangerous drug) and Joe Vickery (seven counts of supplying a dangerous drug) were also charged and issued with notices to appear in court.

The charges against Bird, Falloon, Harrison and Fai Fai Loa were later dismissed due to insufficient evidence however Dowling, Taylor and Vickery were committed to stand trial against the charges.

On 23 February 2015, the football club was placed in voluntary administration and their licence terminated by the NRL after the Board conceded the club could no longer meet its financial obligations, including staff and player salaries. The NRL assumed full ownership of the Gold Coast Titans however Chairwoman Rebecca Frizelle, Directors Darryl Kelly and Paul Donovan remain on the board, with CEO Graham Annesley also remaining in his role.

In November 2015, the club announced the addition of four new independent Board members; Tony Hickey (Founder and Managing Partner, Hickey Lawyers); Trish Hogan (CEO, Pindara Private Hospital); Professor Ned Pankhurst (Senior Deputy Vice Chancellor, Griffith University); and Lynne Anderson (CEO, Australian Paralympic Committee).

On 6 March 2015, it was announced Daly Cherry-Evans had signed a four-year, $4 million deal to play with the Titans starting in 2016. Cherry-Evans later reneged on the deal to remain with the Manly-Warringah Sea Eagles on a $10 million contract extension.

Milestones
 Round 1: Lachlan Burr, Josh Hoffman, Kierran Moseley, Agnatius Paasi, Eddy Pettybourne and Matt Robinson made their debuts for the club
 Round 2: Ryan Simpkins made his debut for the club
 Round 3: Ryan James played his 50th career game
 Round 4: Kane Elgey made his first grade debut
 Round 4: Agnatius Paasi scored his first career try
 Round 4: William Zillman played his 150th career game and Beau Falloon played his 50th game for the club
 Round 6: William Zillman scored his 50th career try
 Round 7: Greg Bird played his 100th game for the club
 Round 8: Kane Elgey and Kierran Moseley scored their first career tries
 Round 15: Nene Macdonald and Chad Redman made their debuts for the club
 Round 15: Lachlan Burr scored his 1st career try
 Round 16: Nate Myles played his 200th career game and Dave Taylor played his 50th game for the club
 Round 18: Nathaniel Peteru made his first grade debut and scored his 1st career try
 Round 22: David Hala made his debut for the club
 Round 23: Leva Li made his first grade debut for the club
 Round 23: Matt White played his 150th career game and Kalifa Faifai Loa his 50th career game
 Round 24: James Roberts played his 50th career game

Squad List

Squad Movement

Gains

Losses

Re-Signings

Contract lengths

Ladder

Fixtures

Pre-season

NRL Auckland Nines

The NRL Auckland Nines is a pre-season rugby league nines competition featuring all 16 NRL clubs. The 2015 competition was played over two days on the 31 January and 1 February at Eden Park. The Titans featured in the Hunua Ranges pool and played the Raiders, Warriors and Tigers. The Titans won only one match and failed to qualify for the quarter finals.

Regular season

Statistics

Source:

Representatives

The following players have played a representative match in 2015.

Honours

League
 Dally M Centre of the Year: James Roberts

Club
 Paul Broughton Medal: Luke Douglas
 Community Award: Ben Ridge
 'The Preston': Anthony Don
 Rookie of the year: Kane Elgey
 Members Choice: Luke Bailey
 U/20s Player of the year: Shaun Hudson

References

Gold Coast Titans seasons
Gold Coast Titans season